Peperomia serpens, the vining peperomia, is a species of flowering plant in the genus Peperomia and family Piperaceae, native to the New World Tropics. The plant is perennial.

The name Peperomia serpens has in the past also been used to describe Peperomia dimota and Peperomia subrotundifolia. In addition the terms Peperomia serpens and Peperomia scandens are sometimes falsely used for Peperomia nitida, perhaps because both are similar vining plants. The Royal Horticultural Society has bestowed the Award of Garden Merit to "Peperomia scandens" as a houseplant, however it is not clear whether this means Peperomia serpens or Peperomia nitida.

References

serpens
House plants
Flora of Southeastern Mexico
Flora of Southwestern Mexico
Flora of Veracruz
Flora of Honduras
Flora of Nicaragua
Flora of Panama
Flora of the Dominican Republic
Flora of Haiti
Flora of Jamaica
Flora of the Leeward Islands
Flora of Puerto Rico
Flora of Trinidad and Tobago
Flora of the Venezuelan Antilles
Flora of the Windward Islands
Flora of northern South America
Flora of western South America
Flora of Brazil
Plants described in 1830
Flora without expected TNC conservation status